Charles O'Brien, (17 March 16999 September 1761), 6th Viscount Clare (titular 9th Earl of Thomond) was an Irish military officer in French service, known to posterity as the Maréchal de Thomond.

Charles O'Brien was the son of Charles O'Brien, 5th Viscount Clare and Charlotte Bulkeley, the sister of Anne, second wife of James FitzJames, 1st Duke of Berwick and Marshal of France. He fought for France against Spain in 1718 with the rank of colonel in the service of his father's regiment and later fought in the War of the Polish Succession in the siege of Philippsburg in June 1734, where he was wounded. He gained the rank of Maréchal de Camp in 1735 in the service of the King's Armies. O'Brien also fought in the Battle of Dettingen in 1743 and in the Battle of Fontenoy in 1745.

When his cousin, Henry O'Brien, 8th Earl of Thomond, offered the Thomond estates to Charles on the condition of his conversion to Protestantism, he refused, and so he willed them to the young son of William O'Brien, 4th Earl of Inchiquin, Murrough, with remainder to Percy Wyndham. Murrough's death in 1741 caused the reversion to become effective, with the estates leaving O'Brien hands.

O'Brien was invested as a Knight, L'Ordre du Saint-Esprit of France on 2 February 1746 at the chapel of Versailles, Île-de-France, France. He held the office of Governor of Neuf-Brisach in Alsace, and was Commander-in-Chief of the province of Languedoc. In 1757 he was made a Marshal of France. He died on 9 September 1761, aged 62, at Montpellier, France.

O'Brien married Marie Genevieve Louise Gautier, daughter of François Gautier, marquis de Chiffreville, in 1755 and had three children:

Charles O'Brien, 7th Viscount Clare (1757-1774), succeeded
Antoinette O'Brien (1759-1808), married Antoine César de Choiseul, Duke of Praslin.
Marie O'Brien (1760-1786)

References

Thomond
French military personnel of the War of the Polish Succession
French military personnel of the War of the Austrian Succession
Charles
Irish chiefs of the name
1699 births
People from Saint-Germain-en-Laye
1761 deaths